Gosselin is a surname.

Gosselin may refer to:

 USS Gosselin (APD-126), a US Navy high-speed transport ship named after Edward W. Gosselin
 Gosselin sextuplets, issue from Jon and Kate
 Gosselin v. Quebec (Attorney General), a Supreme Court of Canada case

Rivers
Gosselin River (Fortier River tributary), in Mauricie, Quebec, Canada
Gosselin River (Nicolet River tributary), a river in Quebec, Canada

Other uses
 Mario Gosselin (disambiguation)

See also
 Gosling (disambiguation), a similar-sounding English surname